Walter de Pembroke was the ninth Archdeacon of Barnstaple.

References

Archdeacons of Barnstaple